Siniša Nikolić (born 2 October 1967 in Stolac) is a former Yugoslav football player. Nikolić played for Željezničar Sarajevo and later, after the war broke out, he emigrated abroad where he played for several clubs. While he was playing for Željezničar, he was part of team who in 1989/90 season had beaten Crvena Zvezda with a 3-0 result. Nikolić had assisted in two out of three goals scored that day.

External links 
 profile at prvaliga.si
 data at RSSSF
 data at RSSSF
 
 1989/90 match Željezničar-Crvena zvezda

1967 births
Living people
Yugoslav footballers
NK Maribor players
FK Željezničar Sarajevo players
Association football midfielders